Vale de Prados is a Portuguese parish located in the municipality of Macedo de Cavaleiros (Bragança District). The population in 2011 was 431, in an area of 10.37 km².

References

Freguesias of Macedo de Cavaleiros